Andrei Bucurescu (born 7 December 1993) is a Romanian rugby union football player. He plays as a flanker for professional SuperLiga club Steaua București. He also plays for Romania's Sevens national team, the Oaks.

Club career
Asides playing for Steaua, Andrei Bucurescu played mostly for Dinamo București and for a short period for CSM București, all in Romanian SuperLiga.

References

External links

1993 births
Living people
Romanian rugby union players
București Wolves players
CS Dinamo București (rugby union) players
CSM București (rugby union) players
CSA Steaua București (rugby union) players
Rugby union flankers